Crazy Magazine is an illustrated satire and humor magazine that was published by Marvel Comics from 1973 to 1983 for a total of 94 regular issues (and two Super Specials (Summer 1975, 1980)). It was preceded by two standard-format comic books titled Crazy. The magazine's format followed in the tradition of Mad, Sick, Cracked and National Lampoon.

Many comic book artists and writers contributed to the effort in the early years. These included Stan Lee, Will Eisner, Vaughn Bodé, Frank Kelly Freas, Harvey Kurtzman, Mike Ploog, Basil Wolverton, Marie Severin, Mike Carlin, editor Marv Wolfman and executive editor Roy Thomas. Mainstream writers like Harlan Ellison and Art Buchwald also contributed. Lee Marrs supplied a few pictures. In addition to drawn art, Crazy experimented with fumetti.

History
Marvel Comics (then known as Atlas Comics) first published a Crazy comic book in 1953. It ran for seven issues, through mid-1954, and was focused on popular culture parodies and humor. The second comic title, as Crazy!, ran for three issues in 1973, and reprinted comics parodies from Marvel's late-1960s Not Brand Echh. Later that year, Marvel repurposed the title for a black-and-white comics magazine. Marv Wolfman edited the first ten issues from 1973–1975 and the first Super Special, and created the magazine's first mascot, a short, bug-eyed man in a large black hat and draped in a black cape. Initially unnamed, the mascot was dubbed "The Nebbish" in issue #9 (Feb. 1975) and later "Irving Nebbish". Wolfman recalled, "Stan Lee wanted it to be more Mad/Cracked, where I wanted it more Lampoon. We sort of split the difference."

Steve Gerber, who served as Crazys editor from issues #11-14, and wanted it to be distinctive from the archetypal Mad, said that the goal was to present work that implied the creators were themselves insane. Gerber's own contributions were often prose stories with a handful of illustrations, such as the "Just Plain Folks" series of bizarre biographies. The last issue of his run as editor included a darkly comic short story he wrote in college, "...And the Birds Hummed Dirges!", about high-school kids who make a suicide pact.

Paul Lamont edited issue #15 (Jan. 1976) and Paul Laikin edited #16-60 and #62 (May 1980).

By 1979, Crazy was struggling in sales. In 1980, the Irving Nebbish mascot was replaced with the belligerent Obnoxio the Clown, who made his first appearance in issue #63 (June 1980), the first regular issue edited by Larry Hama, who had also edited issue #61 (April 1980).

Crazy Magazines last issue was #94 (April 1983).

Recurring features
 The Kinetic Kids—two pages flipped back and forth to create an illusion of motion
 The Teen Hulk—teenager who becomes a Hulk-like character played for laughs
 Retread Funnies—classic Marvel Comics stories presented with new dialogue

Cultural references
The publication was referenced in The Simpsons episode "Separate Vocations". Principal Skinner shows Bart Simpson some of the confiscated contraband in a storeroom at Springfield Elementary School: "Complete collections of Mad, Cracked, and even the occasional issue of Crazy!"

See also
 Mad imitators and variants

References

External links
 Crazy Magazine covers

Monthly magazines published in the United States
Satirical magazines published in the United States
Comics magazines published in the United States
Comics by Marv Wolfman
Comics by Paul Kupperberg
Comics by Steve Gerber
Defunct American comics
Defunct magazines published in the United States
Magazines established in 1973
Magazines disestablished in 1983
Marvel Comics titles
Satirical comics
Parody comics
Black comedy comics
Surreal comedy
1973 comics debuts
1983 comics endings
Comedy franchises